No Fun at All (often abbreviated to just NFAA) is a Swedish punk rock band.

History
The band formed in the summer of 1991 in Skinnskatteberg. The group initially consisted of Mikael Danielsson (guitar), Jimmie Olsson (vocals, drums) and Henrik Sunvisson (bass guitar). The name was inspired by a tongue-in-cheek version of The Stooges' song "No Fun" as covered by the Sex Pistols, and the name of the band Sick of It All. The group released their albums on the Swedish label Burning Heart Records outside the United States. Within the U.S., No Fun at All's albums were released by Theologian Records with the exception of Out Of Bounds which was released by Revelation Records. Epitaph Records released a compilation album known as Master Celebrations in the US in 2002, making it their only release directly on Epitaph despite Burning Heart’s close association with them. 

In 1993, Jimmie Olsson left the band to concentrate on his other band Sober. He has contributed on all subsequent albums (except Out of Bounds) providing backup vocals. No Fun at All then recruited three new members: Ingemar Jansson (vocals), Krister Johansson (guitar) and Kjell Ramstedt (drums). In 1999, Sunvisson quit, Danielsson switched from guitar to bass guitar and Stefan Neuman, from Tribulation, took up the vacant guitar slot. On January 11, 2001, No Fun at All broke up, and played their farewell show later in month.

Since 2004, the band has reunited for several reunion shows. Preceded by a stream of "Never Ending Stream" in October 2008 and the single "Reckless (I Don't Wanna)" on November 1, 2008, they released Low Rider that same month through their own label Beat 'Em Down Records. On April 19, 2012 the Millencolin Festival announced that No Fun At All canceled their show at the festival due to their disbandment . As of May 2013, however, the band became active again and toured Australia in November of that year with Boysetsfire, Off with Their Heads and Jughead's Revenge. They have since toured Australia multiple times, including 2020 (with Pennywise and Strung Out), and October/November 2022 in support of their latest album, "Seventh Wave".

Band members
Timeline

Discography

Studio albums
No Straight Angles (1994)
Out of Bounds (1995)
The Big Knockover (1997)
State of Flow (2000)
Low Rider (2008)
Grit (2018)
Seventh Wave (2022)

EP's
Vision (1993) EP
In a Rhyme (1994) EP
There is a Reason to Believe in Miracles (1995) Split EP
Stranded  (1995) EP
And Now for Something Completely Different (1997) EP
Live in Tokyo (1999) Live EP

Other releases
Touchdown (1992) Demo
Throw It In (1997) Compilation (Released only in Australia)
EP's Going Steady (1998) Compilation
NFAA (2000) Promo
Master Celebrations (2002) Compilation

Singles
Beachparty
In a Rhyme
Stranded
Master Celebrator
Should Have Known
Second Best
Reckless (I Don't Wanna)

References

External links
 No Fun at All Official Website
 No Fun at All's MySpace
 Epitaph Records
 Burning Heart Records
 Theologian Records

Epitaph Records artists
Swedish punk rock groups
Musical groups established in 1991
Burning Heart Records artists
1991 establishments in Sweden